Peter S. Gray (born 24 November 1957 in Paget, Bermuda) is an equestrian who has competed in two Olympic games, been chosen as a reserve in one games and acted as team coach in two more.

Career
In 1980, Gray became the first Bermudian rider to compete internationally when he participated in the alternate 1980 Olympic Games. Gray competed in three-day eventing for Bermuda in the 1984 and 1988 Summer Games. He did not finish in the 1984 Games and came in 31st in the 1988 Games. In 1995 he became a Canadian citizen. At the 1996 and 2000 Summer Games he was the team coach for the Canadian equestrian squad, and in 2004 he was selected as an alternate for the three-day eventing team. He has also begun competing in dressage, although not at the Olympic level. Gray is the co-founder of Equiventures, LLC, a horse show management company.

See also
 Bermuda at the 1984 Summer Olympics
 Bermuda at the 1988 Summer Olympics
 Bermuda at the 1991 Pan American Games

References

External links
 
 
 
 Interview with Gray at horse-canada.com

1957 births
Living people
Bermudian male equestrians
Canadian male equestrians
Olympic equestrians of Bermuda
Equestrians at the 1984 Summer Olympics
Equestrians at the 1988 Summer Olympics
Pan American Games medalists in equestrian
Pan American Games silver medalists for Bermuda
Pan American Games bronze medalists for Bermuda
Equestrians at the 1987 Pan American Games
Equestrians at the 1991 Pan American Games
Medalists at the 1987 Pan American Games
Medalists at the 1991 Pan American Games
University of Guelph alumni
People from Paget Parish